Ares Management Corporation is an American global alternative investment manager operating in the credit, private equity and real estate markets. The company was founded in 1997 and is headquartered in Los Angeles, California, with additional offices across North America, Europe, and Asia.

As of September 2021, Ares Management Corporation's global platform had approximately $295 billion of assets under management and 1,500 employees operating across North America, Europe, Asia Pacific and the Middle East.

History
The firm was established in 1997.  The  co-founders included Antony Ressler, Michael Arougheti, David Kaplan, John H. Kissick, and Bennett Rosenthal. It has several subsidiaries:
Ares Capital Corporation established in 2004: provides financing for middle market acquisitions, recapitalizations, and leveraged buyouts, mainly in the United States. It is a publicly traded closed-end, non-diversified specialty finance company that is regulated as a business development company, or a BDC, under the Investment Company Act of 1940.
Ares Capital Management LLC: an SEC-registered investment adviser, is the investment adviser to Ares Capital Corporation
Ares Management Limited: established in 2006 as an expansion of the Ares business platform into Europe,  focused on Ares European capital markets operations. It is authorized under the Financial Conduct Authority (FCA) in the United Kingdom to provide certain investment advisory services.

In May 2007, a minority interest in the firm was acquired by an international institutional investor, Abu Dhabi Investment Authority. The investor did not acquire any voting or governance rights via its investment.

In May 2014, Ares Management completed its initial public offering and is currently listed on the New York Stock Exchange.  In April 2016, Ares Management closed its fifth global private equity fund, raising $7.85bn. In May 2016, Ares Management announced to buy asset management company American Capital; the US$3.4 billion deal closed in January 2017.

On January 30, 2020, Ares Management acquired a controlling stake in the Hong Kong-based alternative investment firm, SSG Capital Management. The deal was formally completed on July 2, 2020, and SSG Capital Management now operates under the name Ares SSG.

On July 1, 2021, Ares Management announced completion of its acquisition of Black Creek Group's U.S. real estate investment advisory and distribution business.

Operations

The firm is among the largest players in the private debt market.

Ares' investment activities are conducted through four business units:
 Ares Credit Group manages liquid and illiquid credit in the non-investment grade credit sector, with approximately $60.0 billion in assets under management as of May 10, 2016. Credit categories include corporate loans, high yield bonds, institutional credit, credit opportunities, special situations, asset-backed, and direct lending in the U.S. and Europe. Its U.S. corporate lending is primarily conducted through Ares Capital Corporation and a separate commercial finance business that provides asset-based and cash flow loans to small and middle market companies. Ares' European direct lending platform focuses on self-originated investments in illiquid middle market credits across commingled funds, separately managed accounts, and joint venture lending programs.
 Ares Private Equity Group makes opportunistic majority or shared-control investments, principally in under-capitalized middle market companies, and manages investments in U.S. power and infrastructure assets in the power generation, transmission, and midstream sectors. As of 2016, it manages approximately $23.3 billion in assets under management through four corporate private equity commingled funds focused on North America and, to a lesser extent, Europe, one China growth fund and four commingled funds and six related co-investment vehicles focused on U.S. power and infrastructure assets as of May 10, 2016.
 Ares Real Estate Group manages public and private equity and debt investments in real estate assets in North America and Europe. With approximately $10.2 billion in assets under management, it manages several investment vehicles including its publicly traded REIT, Ares Commercial Real Estate Corporation, U.S. and European real estate private equity commingled funds and real estate equity and debt separately managed accounts as of May 10, 2016.
Ares SSG was formed when Ares Management acquired an alternative investment firm, SSG Capital Management. It makes credit, private equity and special situations investments across the Asia-Pacific region.

References

External links
Ares Management (company website)

1997 establishments in California
American companies established in 1997
Private equity firms of the United States
Companies based in Los Angeles
Financial services companies established in 1997
Companies listed on the New York Stock Exchange
2014 initial public offerings
Asset management